Strymonas railway station is a railway station that servers the former municipality Strymonas, and the nearby settlement of Charopo in Serres in Central Macedonia, Greece. The station is located just west of the settlement  (39 Min walk). The neoclassical station building (as of 2021) is unstaffed.

History
The station opened in 1896 on what was the Société du Chemin de Fer Ottoman Jonction Salonique-Constantinople (JSC), built to connect Thessaloniki and Alexandroupoli, a year after the line was completed. In 1896 the company inaugurated the line thus connecting Thessaloniki with Dedeagac (Alexandroupolis), and consequently with Istanbul. During this period, Northern Greece and the southern Balkans were still under Ottoman rule. The area was annexed by Greece on 18 October 1912 during the First Balkan War. During World War I, it came under the control of Bulgaria, but it became part of the Greek state again when the war ended in 1918. On 17 October 1925, the Greek government purchased the Greek sections of the former JSC, and the railway became part of the Hellenic State Railways. In April 1941, after the surrender of the Roupel fortress and the German invasion of Greece, the Bulgarian army occupied the area as part of the triple Axis Occupation of Greece. The Bulgarians left in 1944 with the rest of the retreating Axis powers. In 1970 OSE became the legal successor to the SEK, taking over responsibilities for most of Greece's rail infrastructure. On 1 January 1971, the station and most of the Greek rail infrastructure was transferred to the Hellenic Railways Organisation S.A., a state-owned corporation. Freight traffic declined sharply when the state-imposed monopoly of OSE for the transport of agricultural products and fertilisers ended in the early 1990s. Many small stations of the network with little passenger traffic were closed down. In 2005 the station building closed (with the station downgraded to that of a holt) and was left abandoned. In 2009, with the Greek debt crisis unfolding OSE's Management was forced to reduce services across the network. Timetables were cut back, routes closed, and stations left abandoned as the government-run entity attempted to reduce overheads. Services from Thessaloniki and Alexandroupolis were cut back from six to just two trains a day, reducing the reliability of services and passenger numbers. In May 2017, all Sofia bound through services on the Strymon-Koulatas line were suspended, with a rail replacement bus service to  Koulata, from which passengers board trains for Sofia. In 2017 OSE's passenger transport sector was privatised as TrainOSE, currently a wholly owned subsidiary of Ferrovie dello Stato Italiane infrastructure, including stations, remained under the control of OSE.

Facilities
The station's original 19th-century brick-built station is closed As of (2021) the station is unstaffed, with the booking office closed; however, there are waiting rooms. Access to the platforms is via the lines; though passengers can walk across the rails, it is not wheelchair accessible. Only Platform 1 has shelters with seating. None of the platforms has Dot-matrix display departure and arrival screens or timetable poster boards on the platforms; as a result, the station is currently little more than an unstaffed halt. The station still has its water tower and sidings; however, these are no longer regularly used. The station, however, does Parking in the forecourt, and infrequent buses do call at the station.

Services
The station is served the following TrainOSE services:

 Intercity routes to Thessaloniki and Alexandroupoli (2 trains per day)
 Crossborder route from Strymon to Kulata in Bulgaria; however, this service is suspended and operated by a rail replacement bus.

The station is also served by local and regional buses:

Station layout

Gallery

See also
 Greek railway stations
 Railways of Greece
 Hellenic Railways Organization
 TrainOSE

References

External links
 Strymon Station - National Railway Network Greek Travel Pages

Railway stations in Central Macedonia
Railway stations opened in 1896